State Route 227 (SR 227) is a  east–west state highway in extreme southern Middle Tennessee. It is the only state highway in Tennessee that both begins and ends at the Alabama state line, with one end at Cypress Inn and the other just across the state line from Lexington, Alabama.

Route description

SR 227 begins in Wayne County at the Alabama state line in the Cypress Inn community, where it continues south as Alabama State Route 157 (SR 157). SR 227 immediately makes a sharp right turn at an intersection with Big Cypress Road, which provides access to the Natchez Trace Parkway, before going east through a mix of farmland and wooded areas for several miles to the community of Fairview, where it has a short concurrency with SR 13. It then enters the Highland Rim and winds its way east through mountains to cross into Lawrence County. The highway almost immediately passes through the town of Iron City, where it has an intersection with SR 242 and crosses over Shoal Creek, before going east through mountains to the town of Saint Joseph where it comes to an intersection and becomes concurrent with US 43/SR 6. They head northeast through farmland for a few miles to the town of Loretto, where SR 227 breaks off and turns southeast. SR 227 passes through wooded areas, then very rural farmland, for several miles before coming to the Alabama state line, where it continues into Lexington, Alabama as Alabama State Route 101 (SR 101). Excluding the concurrency with US 43, which is a four-lane undivided highway, the entire route of SR 227 is a two-lane highway.

Major intersections

References

227
Transportation in Wayne County, Tennessee
Transportation in Lawrence County, Tennessee